American rapper and singer Mac Miller released six studio albums, two extended plays, two live albums, thirteen mixtapes, forty-four singles (including fifteen as a featured artist), and sixty-three music videos. After self-releasing several mixtapes, Miller signed with the independent record label Rostrum Records in 2010. He first charted with the release of his debut extended play On and On and Beyond in March 2011, entering the US Billboard 200 at number 55. His single "Donald Trump", from the 2011 mixtape Best Day Ever, became his first singles chart entry, peaking at number 75 on the US Billboard Hot 100, and earned a platinum certification from the Recording Industry Association of America (RIAA).

Miller's debut studio album, Blue Slide Park, topped the Billboard 200 upon its release in November 2011, the first independently-distributed debut album to do so since 1995. The album was certified gold in the United States and Canada, and spawned the songs "Smile Back", "Frick Park Market", and "Party on Fifth Ave.", which peaked at number 55, 60, and 64 on the Billboard Hot 100, respectively. "Loud", the lead single from his 2012 mixtape Macadelic, reached number 53 on the Billboard Hot 100. In March 2013, he collaborated with Ariana Grande on her single "The Way"; it attained his highest peak in the United States at number 9, the Netherlands at 22, and the United Kingdom at 41, and was certified triple platinum by the RIAA. His second studio album, Watching Movies with the Sound Off, released in June 2013 to number three on the Billboard 200.

In 2014, Miller left Rostrum and signed with the major label Warner Bros. Records. His first major label release, GO:OD AM, debuted at number four on the Billboard 200 in September 2015, and was certified gold in the United States. The single "Weekend", featuring Miguel, became his second song as lead artist to be certified platinum by the RIAA. He followed with the studio albums The Divine Feminine in September 2016, and Swimming in August 2018, which respectively charted at number two and three on the Billboard 200. Miller's death in September 2018 propelled Swimming and its single "Self Care" to his highest peaks at the time in various territories, including "Self Care" at number 33 in the United States.

His sixth studio album, Circles, was released posthumously in January 2020. It debuted at number three in the United States, and reached his highest peaks in Australia, Canada and the Netherlands at number three, the United Kingdom at number eight, and Switzerland at number nine. The single "Good News" became his highest-charting song as lead artist in the United States at number 17, Australia at 27, Canada at 14, New Zealand at 31, and the United Kingdom at 45.

Albums

Studio albums

Live albums

Mixtapes

Box sets

Extended plays

Singles

As lead artist

As featured artist

Other charted and certified songs

Music videos

As lead artist

As featured artist

Notes

References

External links
 Official website
 
 
 

Discographies of American artists
Hip hop discographies